Margav-e Sofla (also Romanized as Margāv-e Soflá; also known as Margāb-e Soflá) is a village in Farim Rural District, Dodangeh District, Sari County, Mazandaran Province, Iran. At the 2006 census, its population was 106, in 28 families.

References 

Populated places in Sari County